Bang Bang Machine were a cult indie band from Evesham, Worcestershire in England. They formed in 1989 and split up in 1996 after record company troubles. After 17 years they re-released their back catalogue on iTunes in 2013.

Career
The band experimented with different styles of music, for which reason the media found them hard to categorise.  Musically they covered alternative rock, Goth, pop, ambient and dance. They were sometimes classed as a Shoegaze band, but musically fell between the Britpop and Grunge camps. They were signed to their own "Jimmi Kidd Rekords" then to "Parallel Records" and lastly to "Ultimate Records". BBM were managed by Wayne Perkins for "Chaos Theatre Productions".

Their most famous song, "Geek Love", was inspired by the book by Katherine Dunn about a family of freaks in a travelling circus. The artist David Hughes, who drew the Geek Love book cover, also illustrated the band's Eternal Happiness album cover. "Geek Love" also uses audio samples from the controversial Tod Browning film Freaks. "Geek Love" on CD regularly sells for £25-£35 on www.ebay.co.uk. In 2007 "Geek Love" was voted number 16 on the cult radio station B92's "Top 20 best singles ever" on www.firerecords.com.

"Geek Love" was championed by BBC Radio One DJ John Peel as a perfect example of a band self-financing their debut single; he famously stated, "Even if they never made another record, they'll have achieved more than most of us do in our entire lives."  It was voted number one in his Festive Fifty in 1992.  The band also recorded a Peel Session at Maida Vale 4 which was engineered and produced by Mike Robinson, but this has never been released.

The band were known for creating moving songs about unusual topics. Their song "16 Years" was about the Stefan Kiszko case, where an innocent man was jailed for a crime he did not commit.

They appeared on the Channel 4 programme The Word doing a live version of their song "Technologica" in 1993. They were also featured in Deadline comic and Volume magazine. They did cover versions of T. Rex's "Life's a Gas", Jane's Addiction's "Jayne says" and Psychic TV's "Godstar." Bang Bang Machine made the unusual choice of having different songs on the B-sides of some of their 7-inch singles. Songs such as "I smile" and "You're no good to yourself" only appear on vinyl and not any of their CDs. Usually bands put extra tracks on CDs. The "Evil Circus E.P." spent 2 months in the Indie Charts and reached number 13 in the MELODY MAKER and number 16 in the NME charts. The Evil Circus E.P. was also "Single of the week" in the NME. The re-released "Geek Love" spent 7 weeks in the Indie charts. Bang Bang Machine recorded with the music producers John Fryer, Ray Shulman, Craig Leon and Angus Wallace. Bang Bang Machine toured with Pulp, Catherine Wheel and Eight Storey Window. There was a Bang Bang Machine fanzine called "Bangman" created by BBM fan Leigh Smith.

Steve Eagles now plays with the jazz-psycho-funk-poetic-punk band Blurt and teaches guitar. Lamp is a DJ in Brighton and qualified as a sound engineer. Stan Lee married Elizabeth Freeth in 2005; in 2007 their baby son was born. Stan Lee A.K.A. Marc Angel now plays with Psychowrath, a new incarnation of Wrathchild. In 2007 articles appeared in The Evesham Journal and The Worcester News about possible future one-off gigs. Steve Eagles also plays with The Bad Boys, a covers band made up of professional musicians. Elizabeth and Stan/ Marc have also had another child. BBM fans are still waiting and hoping for Bang Bang Machine to reform. Respected music writer and photographer Mick Mercer brought out a Bang Bang Machine photo book in 2012. The Sunday Times Magazine ran an article on Bang Bang Machine in July 2013 written by Krissi Murison. Also in 2013 Steve Eagles unearthed a box full of "lost" BBM DAT tapes. BBM fans Robert Andersen and Leigh Smith helped him to convert them to CD for possible future online downloads on iTunes. Bang Bang Machine made 49 tracks from their back catalogue available on iTunes from 21 October 2013. In 2015 Steve Eagles re-emerged with a new Evesham band called JUPITRONZ.

Band personnel
Steve Eagles: Guitar
Elizabeth Freeth: Vocals
Stan Lee: Bass
Lamp: Drums

Discography

Early Demos (1989-1990)
 Aim For The Heart (Ramone)
 Planet
 Crystal Town
 White Swan
 Love You More
 Cosmic Kiss
 A Love That Burns
 Divine
(Released on cassettes)

Albums
 (1994) Eternal Happiness
 (1995) Amphibian

Singles
"The Geek" EP (500 promo copies)
"Geek Love" EP
"Evil Circus" EP
"Technologica" EP
"Geek Love Remixes" EP
"Give You Anything"
"Godstar" (Given away free at gigs)
"Breathless"
"Love It Bleeds"
"Show me Your Pain"

Music Videos
"Aim for the heart Ramon".
"Geek Love" Directed by Andy Lee.
"Lovely Lily" Directed by Rob Crabtree.
"Technologica" Directed by Rob Crabtree.
"Give you anything" Directed by Kinofist Productions.
"Breathless" Directed by Mark Nunnely.
"Show me your pain".

References

British indie rock groups
Musical groups established in 1989
Musical groups disestablished in 1996
Culture in Worcestershire